The following is a list of James Madison University alumni.

Athletics 
 Odicci Alexander, softball player
 Macey Brooks, football player
 Daniel Brown, football player for the New York Jets
 Steve Buckhantz, basketball play-by-play announcer for the Washington Wizards
 Mike Caussin, football player
 Gary Clark, football player
 Jeff Compher, Director of Athletics at East Carolina University
 Lindsay Czarniak, ESPN anchor
 Eric Davis, rugby 
 John DeFilippo, NFL quarterback coach
 Ben DiNucci, football player for the Dallas Cowboys
 Dion Foxx, former American football linebacker in the National Football League
 Nelson Garner, football player
 Charles Haley, football player, Football Hall of Fame inductee and five-time Super Bowl Champion with the Cowboys and 49ers
 Tiombe Hurd, USA Olympic track & field athlete (2004);  American record holder in outdoor triple jump
 Jay Jones, football player
 Akeem Jordan, football player for the Washington Redskins
 Delvin Joyce, football player
 Christina Julien, professional soccer player, member of 2011 Canadian women's world cup team
 Curtis Keaton, football player
 Rodney Landers, football player
 Vad Lee, football player
 Dean Marlowe, football player for the Carolina Panthers
 Alan Mayer, soccer player, voted in 1999 the Top JMU Athlete of the Century
 David McLeod, first recipient of the AFL Defensive Player of the Year Award
 Arthur Moats, NFL linebacker and defensive end for the Pittsburgh Steelers
 Jimmy Moreland, football player
 Kurt Morsink, soccer player
 Scott Norwood, football player
 Ed Perry, football player
 John Roberts, Speed TV host
 Elliott Sadler, race car driver, did not graduate
 Billy Sample, baseball player and broadcaster
 C. J. Sapong, Major League Soccer player (forward position) for Philadelphia Union, 2011 MLS Rookie of the Year, USMNT
 Bryan Stinespring, football coach
Linton Townes (born 1959), basketball player
 Mike Venafro, baseball player
 Earl Watford, football player for the Tampa Bay Buccaneers
 Josh Wells, football player for the Tampa Bay Buccaneers
 Tamera Young, basketball player
 Nick Zimmerman, Major League Soccer player for Philadelphia Union

Academics 
 Marcia Angell, Harvard University Medical School faculty member
 Carole Baldwin, research zoologist
 Matt Bondurant, author of The Wettest County in the World; professor at the University of Texas at Dallas
 Kembrew McLeod, faculty member at the University of Iowa
Marney White, Yale University faculty member

Business 
 Steve Arhancet - CEO and co-owner Team Liquid, Liquid Media, & 1UP Studios
 Jason Harris - President and Founder of Mekanism
 John-Paul Lee - founder and CEO of Tavalon Tea
 Christina Tosi - owner of Momofuku Milk Bar; MasterChef judge; James Beard Foundation Award winner: Rising Star Chef
 Kathy J. Warden - CEO of Northrop Grumman
 Jennifer Morgan - Co-Chief Executive Officer, SAP SE

Entertainment 
 Sarah Baker, actress (The Campaign, Mascots)
 Glennon Doyle, author
 Barbara Hall, TV producer and writer
 Steve James, documentary producer and director
 Mia LaBerge, artist
 Geoff LaTulippe, screenwriter
 Karen McCullah Lutz, screenwriter
 Mark Jordan Legan, TV and film writer, NPR correspondent
 Nathan Lyon, host of Discovery Health's television series A Lyon in the Kitchen
 Wendy Maybury, stand-up comedian
 Jon Pineda, author
 Don Rhymer, screenwriter and producer
 Anne Savedge, photographer, artist
 Reshma Shetty, actress (Royal Pains)
 Steven Smith, Fuse TV video jockey
 Patricia Southall, Miss Virginia USA; first runner-up Miss USA
 Chris Sprouse, comic book artist
 Phoef Sutton, film and television writer
 Nina Willner, nonfiction author
 Ashley Iaconetti, television personality (The Bachelor)
 PFT Commenter, blogger, podcast personality (Pardon My Take)
 Tony Schiavone, professional wrestling announcer

Journalism 
 Jim Acosta, Senior White House Correspondent for CNN
 Cornell Belcher, writer, pollster, and political strategist; regular contributor on NBC News, MSNBC, and NPR
 Julia Campbell, newspaper journalist and reporter for CourtTV
 Lawrence Jackson, photojournalist
 Alison Parker, television reporter who, along with videographer Adam Ward, was killed during a live interview in 2015
 Chuck Taylor, music journalist

Music 
 Robert Abisi, DJ (Lost Kings)
 Margaret Becker, Christian rock musician
 The Bigger Lights, alternative rock band
 Ross Copperman, recording artist
 Everything, '90s rock band
 Gifts From Enola, '00s post-rock band
 Keith Howland, musician (Chicago)
 Chris Monroe, musician
 Leroi Moore, musician (Dave Matthews Band)
 Soon Hee Newbold, producer, composer, musician
 Nate Smith, drummer, songwriter, producer
 Butch Taylor, musician (Dave Matthews Band)
 Phil Vassar, country music singer; awarded honorary degree
 Andrew York, musician and composer

Politics and government 
 Dawn Adams, Virginia State Delegate
 Melanie Blunt, First Lady of Missouri (2005–2009)
Dickie Bell, Virginia State Delegate
Chris Collins, Virginia State Delegate
 Kirk Cox, former Speaker of the Virginia House of Delegates
 Sean F. Dalton, member of the New Jersey General Assembly
 David Ellis, Manager of Wake County, North Carolina
 Emmett Hanger, Virginia State Senator
 Jessica Killeen, Deputy Counsel to Virginia Governor Ralph Northam
 James A. "Jay" Leftwich, Jr., Virginia State Delegate
 Ryan McDougle, Virginia State Senator
 Jason Miyares, Attorney General of Virginia
 Matt Rinaldi, Texas State Representative
 Bettina Ring, Virginia Secretary of Agriculture and Forestry
 Walter Shaub, Director of the United States Office of Government Ethics
 Levar Stoney, Mayor of Richmond, Virginia and former Secretary of the Commonwealth of Virginia
 Scott Surovell, Virginia State Senator
 Matthew Wasniewski, Historian of the United States House of Representatives
 Liza Wright, served George W. Bush as Assistant to President for Presidential Personnel and Director of Presidential Personnel
Jeff McKay, Chairman of the Fairfax County, VA Board of Supervisors

References 

James Madison University people
 
James Madison University alumni